Eitoku is a crater on Mercury. It has a diameter of 101 kilometers. Its name was adopted by the International Astronomical Union in 1976. Eitoku is named for the Japanese artist Kanō Eitoku, who lived from 1543 to 1590.

Eitoku is due south of the crater Rublev, which is itself east of the large crater Tolstoj.

References

Impact craters on Mercury